New Lyme may refer to:

New Lyme Township, Ashtabula County, Ohio
New Lyme, Wisconsin